A hybrid solar eclipse will occur on Thursday, April 20, 2023.  A solar eclipse occurs when the Moon passes between Earth and the Sun thereby totally or partly obscuring the image of the Sun for a viewer on Earth. A total solar eclipse occurs when the Moon's apparent diameter is larger than the Sun's, blocking all direct sunlight, turning day into darkness. A hybrid solar eclipse is a rare type of solar eclipse that changes its appearance as the Moon's shadow moves across the earth's surface. Totality occurs in a narrow path across the surface of the Earth, with the partial solar eclipse visible over a surrounding region thousands of kilometres wide. Hybrid solar eclipses are extremely rare with only 3.1% of solar eclipses in the 21st century, hybrid eclipses. 

Totality for this eclipse will be visible in the North West Cape peninsula and Barrow Island in Western Australia, eastern parts of East Timor, as well as Damar Island and parts of the province of Papua in Indonesia.

It is a hybrid eclipse, with portions of its path near sunrise and sunset as annular.

Images
Animated path

Related eclipses

Tzolkinex 
 Preceded by: Solar eclipse of March 8-9, 2016
 Followed by: Solar eclipse of June 1, 2030

Half-Saros cycle 
 Preceded by: Lunar eclipse of April 15, 2014
 Followed by: Lunar eclipse of April 25, 2032

Tritos 
 Preceded by: Solar eclipse of May 20-21, 2012
 Followed by: Solar eclipse of March 20, 2034

Solar Saros 129 
 Preceded by: Solar eclipse of April 8, 2005
 Followed by: Solar eclipse of April 30, 2041

Inex 
 Preceded by: Solar eclipse of May 10, 1994
 Followed by: Solar eclipse of March 30, 2052

Triad 
 Preceded by: Solar eclipse of June 19, 1936
 Followed by: Solar eclipse of February 18-19, 2110

Eclipses of 2023 
 A hybrid solar eclipse on April 20.
 A penumbral lunar eclipse on May 5.
 An annular solar eclipse on October 14.
 A partial lunar eclipse on October 28.

Solar eclipses of 2022–2025

Saros 129

Inex series

Tritos series

Metonic series

References

External links

Hybrid solar eclipses
2023 in science
2023 04 20
2023 04 20